The 2007 Wilkes-Barre/Scranton Pioneers season was the team's sixth season as a member of the af2.  Under coach Rich Ingold and led by quarterback Ryan Vena, the Pioneers advanced to their fourth straight playoff appearance, winning three games at home to earn a spot in the ArenaCup.  The Pioneers lost the championship to the Tulsa Talons 73–66 after the Pioneers' final pass play in the waning seconds of the game fell short.  Several members of the team were given season awards, including David Davis as 2007 Havoc Kicker of the year, Ryan Vena as Schutt Offensive Player of the Year, and Coach Ingold as Sportexe Coach of the Year.

Schedule

Regular season

Postseason

Final standings

Attendance

References

External links
ArenaFan Online 2007 Wilkes-Barre/Pioneers schedule
ArenaFan Online 2007 af2 standings
ArenaFan Online 2007 af2 attendance

Wilkes-Barre/Scranton Pioneers seasons
Wilkes-Barre Scranton Pioneers
2007 in American football